The Adams County School District 12, commonly known as the Adams 12 Five Star Schools, is a public school district located in western Adams County, Colorado, United States.  The district serves the suburban area immediately north of Denver including the communities of Broomfield, Federal Heights, Northglenn, Thornton, and Westminster.

Population

Statistics
As of 2011, the Colorado school district consists of 32 elementary schools, 9 middle schools, 5 high schools, 4 charter schools, 1 alternative school, 1 technical education center, and 1 adult education center, with nearly 39,000 students enrolled in the district.  Although there are approximately 68 different spoken languages throughout the district, the ESL (English as a second language) population of nearly 5,000 students consists of mainly Hispanics.  Almost 3,000 students participate in the gifted and talented program, and almost 3,500 students have special education needs.  Over 14,000 students travel to school by bus, and over 10,500 students receive a free or reduced lunch.

Along with the large student body, the district also has a large teacher work force.  At the end of 2006, the district contained 1,918 classroom teacher, and 917 of those teachers had some kind of advanced degree.  The teachers in the district have, on average, 10.65 years of total teaching experience and 9.19 years of employment within the district.  Only .01% of the entire teacher workforce have emergency licenses.

Demographics
Hispanics 62.11%
White/Caucasian: 23.00%
Asian/Pacific Islander: 5.15%
African–American: 2.71% 
Native American: 0.99%

Schools

Elementary schools

School of blind reading
Arapahoe Ridge Elementary School
Centennial Elementary School
Cherry Drive Elementary School
Coronado Hills Elementary School
Cotton Creek Elementary School
Coyote Ridge Elementary School
Eagleview Elementary School
Elementary School 32 (under construction)
Federal Heights Elementary School
Glacier Peak Elementary School
Hillcrest Elementary School
Hulstrom Options School (K-8)
Hunters Glen Elementary School
Leroy Drive Elementary School
Lochbuie Elementary School
Malley Drive Elementary School
McElwain Elementary School
Meridian Elementary School
Mountain View Elementary School
North Mor Elementary School
North Star Elementary School
Prairie Hills Elementary School
Riverdale Elementary School
Rocky Mountain Elementary School
Silver Creek Elementary School
Skyview Elementary School
Stellar Elementary School
STEM Magnet Lab School
The Studio School
Stukey Elementary School
Tarver Elementary School
Thornton Elementary School
Thunder Vista P-8 School
Westview Elementary School
Woodglen Elementary School

Middle schools

Rocky Top Middle School
Westlake Middle School
Shadow Ridge Middle School
Northglenn Middle School
Silver Hills Middle School 
The International School at Thornton Middle
Century Middle School
Crossroads Alternative School
Hulstrom Options School (K-8)

High schools

Bollman Technical Education Center School
Horizon High School
Legacy High School
Mountain Range High School
Northglenn High School
Thornton High School
Vantage Point High School

Former schools
 High Plains High School

Programs

STEM
Northglenn High School has offered a STEM program for those who went to STEM middle schools in the district, or who sign up before freshman year.

International Baccalaureate
Thornton High School is the site of the district's IB (International Baccalaureate) and MYP (Middle Years Programme).  The International School at Thornton Middle and Century Middle School are authorized for the MYP Program for young people in sixth through eighth grades. Leroy Drive and Coronado Hills Elementary Schools are authorized for the PYP Programme for students in grades kindergarten through fifth.

Legacy 2000 Program
Legacy High School is the site of the Legacy 2000 Program, an academic program that focuses on math, science, and technology. The program has been in place since the school's founding in 2000.

SOAR Honors Program
Horizon High School is the site of the district's SOAR Honor Program. SOAR has existed at the school since 2008, and is a pre-collegiate program developed by Horizon High School's teachers.

Misc.
The Adams 12 district provides adult education, driver's education, and outdoor education courses.  The district also provides pre-school and summer school services along with the BASE (Before and After School and Summer Enrichment) program, which is offered at its elementary schools.

Personnel

 Kathy D. Plomer – president – District 3
 Laura P. Mitchell – vice president – District 5
 Norman L. Jennings – secretary – District 1
 Brian M. Batz – director – District 4
 Jamey L. Lockley – director – District 2

References

External links

School districts in Colorado
Education in Adams County, Colorado
Education in Thornton, Colorado
Education in Broomfield, Colorado